The England national cricket team toured the West Indies from January to April 1981 and played a five-match Test series against the West Indies cricket team which the West Indies won 2–0. England were captained by Ian Botham; the West Indies by Clive Lloyd. The second Test of the tour was cancelled, after Robin Jackman's visa was revoked by the Guyanese government, for playing and coaching in South Africa. In the third Test, England's opening batsman Geoff Boycott was dismissed for a duck, after six balls bowled by Michael Holding. It has been described as the greatest over in Test cricket.

In addition, the teams played a two-match Limited Overs International (LOI) series which the West Indies won 2–0.

Test series summary

First Test

Second Test

Third Test

Fourth Test

Fifth Test

One Day Internationals (ODIs)

1st ODI

2nd ODI

References

External links
 Series home at ESPN Cricinfo

1981 in English cricket
1981 in West Indian cricket
1980-81
International cricket competitions from 1980–81 to 1985
West Indian cricket seasons from 1970–71 to 1999–2000